The 2003 Anambra State gubernatorial election occurred on April 19, 2003. PDP's Chris Ngige won election, defeating APGA's Peter Obi and other candidates.

Chinwoke Mbadinuju won at the PDP primary election, but the nomination was given to Chris Ngige, making him to switch to AD. Ngige's running mate was Okey Udeh.

Electoral system
The Governor of Anambra State is elected using the plurality voting system.

Results
A total of seven candidates registered with the Independent National Electoral Commission to contest in the election. PDP candidate Chris Ngige won election for a first tenure, defeating APGA's candidate, Peter Obi and other candidates.

The total number of registered voters in the state was 1,859,795. However, only 47.22% (i.e. 878,212) of registered voters participated in the exercise.

References 

Anambra State gubernatorial elections
Anambra State gubernatorial election
Anambra State gubernatorial election